Ben Younger (born October 7, 1972) is an American screenwriter and film director.

Biography

Early life and career
Younger was born in Brooklyn, and raised in a Modern Orthodox Jewish household in Eltingville, Staten Island and in Fair Lawn, New Jersey. He attended a yeshiva, before entering Queens College, part of the City University of New York, where he studied political science. While at university, he started performing comedy. After leaving university, he set his sights on a career in politics, taking on a role as a policy analyst for the New York City comptroller's office, where he served as a legislative aide to Alan Hevesi. After that, he successfully managed the State Assembly campaign for Queens Democrat Melinda Katz, becoming, at 21, the city's youngest ever campaign manager.

Despite his success, Younger became disenchanted with politics, and by 1995 started to seek a creative outlet that would rekindle the excitement he felt as a stand-up comedian. He wrote and directed a short film,L & M, as well as working on a number of feature films as a grip, and directing music videos and commercials.

Boiler Room
In 1995, he attended an interview for a job in a brokerage firm, and immediately conceived the idea that went on to become his first film, Boiler Room. He spent two years researching the underground telemarketing brokerage industry as background for his screenplay. Boiler Room was released in 2000. A corporate drama in the mold of Wall Street and Glengarry Glen Ross, with colorful dialogue that some critics compared to David Mamet, the film exposed the shady world of "chop shops" (underground brokerage firms), and starred Giovanni Ribisi, Vin Diesel, Nicky Katt, Jamie Kennedy, and Ben Affleck.

Prime
Younger's second film, Prime (2005), is a romantic comedy about the relationship between a young Jewish man and an older gentile woman. The film stars Uma Thurman and Meryl Streep. The movie was prominently featured in the HBO show Unscripted because Bryan Greenberg, star of Unscripted was also the male lead in Prime. Younger appeared as himself in the episodes where the movie was featured.

Bleed for This
Younger's third film Bleed for This is an American biographical drama based on the life of former World Champion Boxer Vinny Pazienza. Younger both wrote and directed. The film stars Miles Teller, Katey Sagal, Amanda Clayton and Aaron Eckhart, and is executive produced by Martin Scorsese. The film was released on November 18, 2016.

Other projects
In addition to his film projects, Younger has been published in The New Yorker, and has sold numerous television pilots to FX, NBC, ABC and Fox, to name a few.

Younger is a keen motorcycle racing enthusiast, and has expressed a desire to make a film about road racing.

Filmography

Director
 Boiler Room (2000)
 The Hit Man and the Investigator (2001)
 The Car Thief and the Hit Man (2001)
 Toothpaste (2004)
 Prime (2005)
 Army Wives (1 episode, 2007)
 Bleed for This (2016)

Producer
 Maestro (1998)

Writer
 Boiler Room (2000)
 Prime (2005)
 Bleed for This (2016)

Awards and nominations

References

External links
 
 Bard of the Boiler Room – New York Metro feature
 The Prime of Ben Younger
 Interview at SuicideGirls.com

1972 births
Living people
American male screenwriters
Jewish American screenwriters
American television directors
Film producers from New York (state)
Queens College, City University of New York alumni
People from Eltingville, Staten Island
Film directors from New York City
Screenwriters from New York (state)
21st-century American Jews